Novokazanka is a rural locality (a village) in Znamensky Selsoviet, Belebeyevsky District, Bashkortostan, Russia. The population was 52 as of 2010. There is 1 street.

Geography 
Novokazanka is located 40 km east of Belebey (the district's administrative centre) by road. Novosarayevo is the nearest rural locality.

References 

Rural localities in Belebeyevsky District